The  is an annual marathon sporting event for men and women over the classic distance of 42.195 kilometres which is held in mid February in Kyoto, Japan. The course starts at Nishikyogoku Athletic Stadium and pass through Kyoto Botanical Gardens and the right bank of Kamo river and finishes near Heian Jingu. It was one of the top ten most expensive of the world's biggest marathons by entry cost in 2015.

An event with the same name was held from 1969 to 1982.

Results
Key:

Kyoto Marathon (1969–1982)

References

External links 
 Kyoto Marathon official website
 
 List of Certified Marathon Courses in 2016 — International Association of Athletics Federations

Marathons in Japan
Recurring sporting events established in 2012
Sport in Kyoto